The afep pigeon (Columba unicincta), also known as the African wood-pigeon or gray wood-pigeon, is a member of the family Columbidae which lives in the Equatorial Forests of Africa.

Taxonomy
The afep pigeon was described by the American ornithologist John Cassin in 1860 from a specimen collected in West Africa from the Ogooué River, Gabon. He coined the binomial name Columba unicincta. The specific epithet combines the Latin uni- "one-" and cinctus "banded". The English name "afep" is the word for a pigeon in the Bulu language of Cameroon. The species is monotypic.

Description 
The sexes are similar. It has a gray neck and body, with darker gray wings and tail. The throat and belly are white. The breast is buff-pink. The eyes and orbital rings are red.

This pigeon has a loud call. It sounds like "doo doo doo" or "whu whu whu whu-WHU".

Distribution
They are found in two disjunct areas of the African tropical rainforest. In particular, they can be found in Sierra Leone, southern Guinea, Liberia, Ivory Coast and Ghana. Their range also includes south-eastern Nigeria, Cameroon, Gabon, Equatorial Guinea, Republic of Congo, Democratic Republic of Congo, Central African Republic, Uganda and Angola.

Behavior

Diet 
Afep pigeons mainly feed on grain and seeds.

Reproduction 
They mainly breed in the second half of the dry season. The female pigeon usually lays between 1 and 3 eggs. Both parents help raise the chicks. They are incubated for between 14 and 18 days. They are fed with crop milk after hatching. A few days later, they will start eating small pieces of solid food. They leave the nest 20 to 25 days after they hatch.

Conservation 
They are classified by the IUCN as of least concern. Their population is stable and unfragmented, though the exact number of birds is unknown.

References

External links 
 Xeno-canto: Audio recordings of the Afep pigeon
 Afep Pigeon Breed Guide - Pigeonpedia
 Photos, videos and observations at Cornell Lab of Ornithologys Birds of the World
 about an Afep pigeon

Afep pigeon
Birds of the African tropical rainforest
Afep pigeon